Matthew Chitty Darby, later Darby-Griffith, (1772 Newtown, Hampshire –1823) was a British soldier and Major-General.

He was a son of Vice-Admiral George Darby and Mary daughter of Sir William St Quintin, 4th Baronet. He took the additional name of Griffith upon inheriting the estate of Padworth in the English county of Berkshire.

Darby's thirty years' service in the Grenadier Guards included much action during the Napoleonic Wars. He lost his leg at the Battle of Corunna in Spain in 1809, and was awarded the War Medal with one clasp for the part he played there.

He died on 7 August 1823 at Padworth House. He had married Lousia, daughter of Thomas Hankey Esq. of Fetcham Park, Surrey, and they became the parents of three sons and one daughter, including Christopher Darby-Griffith, MP and General Henry Darby-Griffith, CB.

References
Hart's Annual Army List. (1863)
Royal Berkshire History: Matthew Chitty Darby-Griffith (1772-1823)

1772 births
1823 deaths
British amputees
British Army commanders of the Napoleonic Wars
British Army major generals
British Army personnel of the French Revolutionary Wars
Grenadier Guards officers
People from West Berkshire District
People from Newtown, Hampshire
Military personnel from Hampshire